Minareli is a village in the District of Akseki, Antalya Province, Turkey.

References

Villages in Akseki District